Ectinosomatidae is a family of the Harpacticoida, a huge group of crustaceans belonging to the subclass Copepoda. Like most of their relatives, they are usually benthic inhabitants of marine environments. Ectinosomatidae commonly inhabit sediment and fragments of dead corals or glass sponges, and occasionally algae and bryozoans, in the deep oceans. In the epifaunal species, the first leg pair is often modified to allow the animals a better grip on the substrate.

Genera
More than 20 genera are included in the family:

 Arenosetella C. B. Wilson, 1932
 Bradya Boeck, 1872
 Bradyellopsis Brian, 1923
 Chaulionyx Kihara & Huys, 2009
 Ectinosoma Boeck, 1865 (including Helectinsoma)
 Ectinosomella G. O. Sars, 1910
 Ectinosomoides Nicholls, 1945
 Glabrotelson Huys in Kihara & Huys, 2009
 Halectinosoma Lang, 1944 (including Pararenosetella)
 Halophytophilus Brian, 1919 (including Alophytophilus)
 Hastigerella Nicholls, 1935
 Klieosoma Hicks & Schriever, 1985
 Microsetella Brady & Robertson, 1873
 Noodtiella Wells, 1965 (including Lineosoma)
 Oikopus Wells, 1967
 Parabradya Lang, 1944
 Peltobradya Médioni & Soyer, 1967
 Pseudectinosoma Kunz, 1935
 Pseudobradya G. O. Sars, 1904
 Rangabradya Karanovic & Pesce, 2001
 Sigmatidium Giesbrecht, 1881
 Tetanopsis Brady, 1910

References

Harpacticoida
Crustacean families